Baron Rankeillour, of Buxted in the County of Sussex, is a title in the Peerage of the United Kingdom. It was created in 1932 for the Conservative politician James Fitzalan Hope. He was the grandson of General Sir Alexander Hope, fourth son of John Hope, 2nd Earl of Hopetoun (from whom the Marquesses of Linlithgow descend; see this title for earlier history of the family). His eldest son, Arthur Hope (from 1949, the second Baron), was also a Conservative politician and held junior ministerial office. From 1940 to 1946 he served as Governor of Madras. He was succeeded by his younger brother, the third Baron. On the death in 2005 of his only son, the fourth Baron, who was unmarried, he was succeeded by his first cousin, the fifth and  present holder of the title, the eldest son of the Hon. Richard Frederick Hope, who was the youngest son of the first Baron. 

The second son of the 2nd baronet (who was father of the 8th baronet) served on the Court of Session from 1689 under the judicial title of Lord Rankeillour.

Barons Rankeillour (1932)

James Fitzalan Hope, 1st Baron Rankeillour (1870–1949)
Arthur Oswald James Hope, 2nd Baron Rankeillour (1897–1958)
Henry John Hope, 3rd Baron Rankeillour (1899–1967)
Peter St Thomas More Henry Hope, 4th Baron Rankeillour (1935–2005)
Michael Richard Hope, 5th Baron Rankeillour (1940–2022)
James Francis Hope, 6th Baron Rankeillour (b. 1968)

The heir apparent is the present holder's son Hon. Charlie James Hope (b. 2003).

Line of Succession

  James Fitzalan Hope, 1st Baron Rankeillour (1870 - 1949)
  Arthur Oswald James Hope, 2nd Baron Rankeillour (1897 - 1958)
  Henry John Hope, 3rd Baron Rankeilliour (1899 - 1967)
  Peter St Thomas More Hope, 4th Baron Rankeillour (1935 - 2005)
 Hon. Richard Frederick Hope (1901 - 1964)
  Michael Richard Hope, 5th Baron Rankeillour (1940 - 2022)
  James Francis Hope, 6th Baron Rankeillour (1968 -)

See also
Marquess of Linlithgow
Baron Glendevon

Notes

References
Kidd, Charles, Williamson, David (editors). Debrett's Peerage and Baronetage (1990 edition). New York: St Martin's Press, 1990.

External links
Portrait of James Fitzalan Hope

Baronies in the Peerage of the United Kingdom
Noble titles created in 1932
Noble titles created for UK MPs
Rankeillour
People from Buxted